Mushfig Shahverdiyev (12 september 1983, Lankaran) is an Azerbaijani actor, comedian and screenwriter. He began his career for the first time in 2007 with the film "Burnt Bridges". In 2011, he became popular with the comedy series "Bu da Bu".

Life and career 

Shahverdiyev Mushfig Faig was born in 1983 in Lankaran. He won an expensive car as the winner of the 11th "Revenge" speed of the reality show "Mashin".

"My name is Intikham" is the project manager and lead actor of the national comedy film. The comedy has been shown in cinemas since November 28, 2014. Since independence, Azerbaijan has gone down in history as the most watched film among local films.

Filmography 
 Bu da bu (2011)
 My name is Intiqam (2014)
 Milyonluk Kuş (2018)
 Yanmış körpüler (film, 2007)
 Niye? (film, 2017)
 Niye? 2 (film, 2017)
 Ağ Tük
 Miras (film, 2008)
 My name is İntiqam (film, 2014)
 Qayınanamız (Series, 2015)
 My name is İntiqam 2: Moldova (film, 2015)
 Gizlenpaç (film, 2016)
 O başdannan (TV show, 2018)

References 

1. 

2. 

3. 

4. 

5. 

6. 

7. 

8. 

21st-century Azerbaijani male actors
1983 births
People from Lankaran
Living people